Nitzana is an educational youth village and community settlement in southern Israel. Located in the western Negev desert, adjacent to the Egyptian border, it falls under the jurisdiction of Ramat HaNegev Regional Council.

Ancient Nitzana (3rd c. BC-7th c. AD)

Ancient Nitzana was founded by the Nabataeans in the 3rd century BC. There are traces of a large first century BC building with a monumental staircase. The settlement was a trading post on the Eilat to Gaza route. In the early 2nd century AD the emperor Hadrian diverted this trade from Elat to Damascus. Despite this loss Nitzana grew under Byzantine rule. In the late 3rd century AD the fort was enlarged with stables for horses and camels. In the 4th century a church was built attached to the north end of the fort. It was dedicated to SS Sergius and Baccus. In the 7th century a second church, dedicated to the Virgin Mary was built 60m south east of the fort.

The tax register for 587-9 AD indicates that the town had 1,500 inhabitants, with 116 houses. This was a time of prosperity with the route from Gaza to Elat reopened and pilgrim traffic to Saint Catherine's Monastery. A find of late Byzantine papyri has given much detail of the life of the town.

Following the arrival of Islam the town went into a slow decline and by the 8th century it had ceased to exist.

Modern village
It also gives its name to the Nitzana Border Crossing, formerly Auja al-Hafir. It was the site of Operation Volcano in 1955, an Israeli raid against Egyptian positions. On 18 June 2012 an Israeli was killed in a terrorist attack near the village.

See also
Nitzanei Sinai, a nearby community settlement.

References

Community settlements
Youth villages in Israel
Populated places established in 1987
1987 establishments in Israel
Populated places in Southern District (Israel)